Bonecrusher (17 September 1982 – 10 June 2015) was a champion New Zealand Thoroughbred racehorse who was widely admired in both Australia and New Zealand.

Bred by Bill Punch, by the sire Pag-Asa, his dam's sire was a son of a French champion, Tantieme. Pag-Asa was brought to New Zealand by Owen Larson.

Bonecrusher was purchased by Peter Mitchell for just NZ$3,250 at the Waikato Yearling Sales, and was trained by Frank Ritchie. Peter also bought Bonecrusher's full brother. A chestnut, Bonecrusher was nicknamed Big Red - the same name as the champions Man o' War, Secretariat and Phar Lap.

Racing career 
Bonecrusher was the 'People's Champion,' loved by everyone who saw the fiery big chestnut in action.

His trainer was Frank Ritchie, and his strapper was Frank Ritchie's son Shaune Ritchie. Frank was trying to establish himself in the top echelon of trainers, while Shaune was only sixteen-years-old and straight out of high school, determined to find his own path in the thoroughbred racing industry. "I was battling away, and although I had trained a Group winner in Australia, it was when he arrived that it really changed my life," Frank Ritchie said.

All up, Bonechrusher raced 44 times for 18 wins, 5 second places, and 12 third places. His races ranged from 880m to 2400m. He won 9 Group One races, 3 Group 2 races, and 2 Group 3 races, and earned prize money of NZ$674,225 and Au$1,679,495. He was the first New Zealand racehorse to win over NZ$1 million in prize money, and his combined New Zealand and Australia career earnings were approximately 3 million dollars. Bonecrusher won four Group One races in New Zealand, including the New Zealand Derby, and six Group One races in Australia, including the Tancred Stakes, the Australian Derby, the Underwood Stakes, the Caulfield Stakes, the Cox Plate, and the Australian Cup.

Bonecrusher first hit the track in August 1984 where he won three of his first five starts as a juvenile including one at Group Three) level at Ellerslie before embarking on an ill-fated three race campaign in Australia.

Brought home after three lacklustre runs he commenced his three-year-old campaign with four consecutive placings including finishing third behind Random Chance and Field Dancer in the 1985 Group One New Zealand 2000 Guineas run at 1600m at Riccarton.  Ritchie was convinced that trip away was the making of the horse. "He had hurt himself in an incident on the truck before he went to Christchurch and missed a lot of work," he said. "He went into the 2000 Guineas underdone and I thought at the time the race would either flatten him or bring him on and thankfully it was the latter."

Bonecrusher won his next seven starts straight including the Group One Bayer Classic (1600m) and the Group 1 New Zealand Derby (2400m), before defeating the older horses in the Group 1 Air New Zealand Stakes (2000m) at Ellerslie Racecourse in Auckland.

Then he went to Sydney and he won the Group 1 H E Tancred Stakes (2400m) and finished off with a win in the Group 1 Australian Derby (2400m).

Bonecrusher scaled his greatest heights in the spring of 1986 in the Cox Plate, where the athletic chestnut prevailed in the 'Race of the Century' with another New Zealand champion, Waverley Star. The two great horses went to war from the 600m mark and separated themselves from the rest of the field, with Bonecrusher narrowly prevailing in a titanic head-to-head struggle that caller Bill Collins summed up with the famous line "Bonecrusher races into equine immortality." Amongst the enthralled onlookers was strapper and now successful trainer in his own right, Shaune Ritchie, who struggled to take in the wild scenes in the aftermath that followed. "I was sixteen and left school to go and look after the horse in Melbourne for that campaign," Shaune Ritchie said. "It was a pretty big thing as back then an OE (overseas experience) wasn’t a normal thing so just to go to Australia was a big trip. After the race it was just amazing and I still remember the way the crowd stayed on to greet him and watch the presentation after the race. Australians are punters and normally when a race is finished, they are off to the bookies to bet on the next race coming up."

Later that year, Bonecrusher was the pre-post favourite against some of the world's best racehorses in the Japan Cup but contracted a virus in Tokyo, nearly lost his life, and had to withdraw from the race.

The next year Bonecrusher had recovered from his illness and won the 1987 Australian Cup, beating At Talaq, and was named Horse of the Year in New Zealand and Australia for the 1986–1987 season. He was the first horse to be awarded both titles. He was also a Government appointed 'Equine Ambassador' for New Zealand in 1986.

Bonecrusher continued to campaign at five, six, and seven years of age. He won three races in New Zealand, including a second Air New Zealand Stakes in 1988, but was unable to reach his previous heights in Australia.

Bonecrusher's racing career included the following:

Retirement 
After retirement Bonecrusher was cared for by his owner, Peter Mitchell, on a property in Takanini. In retirement, he was a guest of the Moonee Valley Racing Club. His last public appearance was Derby Day in 2003. In 2010, he was inducted into the New Zealand Racing Hall of Fame. Bonecrusher was euthanised in June 2015 after contracting laminitis.

Bonecrusher was buried beside the saddling paddock at Ellerslie Racecourse, as he won his first race, his first Group race, and all three of his New Zealand Group One races at Ellerslie. A bronze statue was set above him. The life-sized replica is of the champion racehorse in action and includes his famous shoulder scar and unique protruding tongue. At the end of the plaque below the statue, it says 'Bonecrusher: The Pride of Ellerslie'

"To see Bonecrusher immortalised like this stirs a lot of emotion and brings back a lot of great memories," his trainer Frank Ritchie said.

"People still want to talk about him to this day and in a radio interview I did recently I think I spent three minutes talking about my runners in the Auckland Cup and the New Zealand Oaks, and another 17 minutes on Bonecrusher, a horse that retired 30 years ago."

"He didn’t have the brilliance of Black Caviar or the dominance of Winx, but why people loved him so much was his courage, and when it looked like he couldn’t win, he would win. I doubt that there has been a story written about Dad or I that hasn’t included Bonecrusher somewhere in it and I have no problem with that as who doesn’t want to be associated with such a wonderful animal."

"The fact that every day you go to Ellerslie you see the magnificent statue there of him, that he is buried underneath, is very special and it is very nice to have."

Bonecrusher's strapper, trainer Frank Ritchie's son Shaune Ritchie, is now a trainer based in Cambridge who trained 2010 New Zealand Derby winner Military Move, and 2006 New Zealand 2000 Guineas winner and runner-up in the 2007 Kelt Capital Stakes, Magic Cape.

Bonecrusher song 
In October 1986, Bonecrusher's achievements on the track became the inspiration for a song released by fellow Ellerslie locals, Wayne Cann, Gordon Evans and John Scull. Titled "Tribute to a Champion", the song promoted Bonecrusher as a New Zealand Sports Ambassador, and featured lyrics which stated that he could be "the greatest since Phar Lap" and named him as the "pride of Ellerslie". While not available in stores, fans were asked to send orders through the "Bonecrusher Song Child Cancer Appeal", which donated NZ$1 from each sale to the child cancer foundation.

See also
 List of millionaire racehorses in Australia
 Thoroughbred racing in New Zealand
 The Bonecrusher New Zealand Stakes - Bonecrusher won this race in 1986 and 1988 when it was known as the Air New Zealand Stakes.

References

External links
 Bonecrusher's Scrapbook (official site)
 Youtube video - the "Race of the Century"
 Youtube video - tribute to Champion Bonecrusher
 New Zealand Thoroughbred Racing Annual 1990 (19th edition). Dillon, Mike, Editor. Moa Publications, Auckland, New Zealand.
 New Zealand Thoroughbred Racing Annual 1987 (16th edition). Dillon, Mike, Editor. Moa Publications, Auckland, New Zealand.
 New Zealand Thoroughbred Racing Annual 1986 (15th edition). Dillon, Mike, Editor. Moa Publications, Auckland, New Zealand.
 New Zealand Thoroughbred Racing Annual 1985 (14th edition). Costello, John, Editor. Moa Publications, Auckland, New Zealand.

1982 racehorse births
2015 racehorse deaths
Australian Champion Racehorse of the Year
Cox Plate winners
Racehorses bred in New Zealand
Racehorses trained in New Zealand
Thoroughbred family 22-b
New Zealand Racing Hall of Fame horses